The First National Bank is a historic two-frame building, constructed in 1907, and located at 101 S. Main St. in Erick, Oklahoma. While the building was primarily used as the city's bank, it also housed a barbershop in the rear and at one point had a second barbershop in the basement. The second floor held various professional offices, including the courts of local justices of the peace. The bank operated there until 1968, during which time it served as Erick's commercial center.

After the bank closed, the 100th Meridian Museum occupied the building; the museum commemorates the survey of the 100th meridian west, a benchmark of which is set in the bank's wall.

The bank was added to the National Register of Historic Places on December 11, 1979.

References

External links
100th Meridian Museum  - Erick Chamber of Commerce

Bank buildings on the National Register of Historic Places in Oklahoma
Commercial buildings completed in 1907
Buildings and structures in Beckham County, Oklahoma
Museums in Beckham County, Oklahoma
History museums in Oklahoma
National Register of Historic Places in Beckham County, Oklahoma